is a wrestler from Japan. She won the gold medal in the women's 69 kg event at the 2016 Summer Olympics held in Rio de Janeiro, Brazil. She also won the gold medal in her event at the 2017 World Wrestling Championships held in Paris, France.

Career
She competes in the 67kg division and won the gold medal at the 2013 Summer Universiade in the same division defeating Ochirbatyn Nasanburmaa of Mongolia in the final. She also won the bronze medal the 2013 World Wrestling Championships. She won the gold medal in women's freestyle (69kg) at the 2016 Olympic Games in Rio de Janeiro.

In 2021, she lost her bronze medal match in the women's 68 kg event at the 2020 Summer Olympics held in Tokyo, Japan.

Championships and accomplishments
 Tokyo Sports
 Wrestling Special Award (2016, 2017)

References

External links
 
 
 

1994 births
Living people
Japanese female sport wrestlers
World Wrestling Championships medalists
Olympic wrestlers of Japan
Olympic gold medalists for Japan
Olympic medalists in wrestling
Wrestlers at the 2016 Summer Olympics
Wrestlers at the 2020 Summer Olympics
Medalists at the 2016 Summer Olympics
Universiade medalists in wrestling
Universiade gold medalists for Japan
Medalists at the 2013 Summer Universiade
21st-century Japanese women